A. glauca  may refer to:
 Abarema glauca, the glaucous abarema, a tree species found only in Cuba
 Agoseris glauca, the pale agoseris, prairie agoseris or short-beaked agoseris, a flowering plant species native to North America from Alaska to Ontario to New Mexico
 Arctostaphylos glauca, the bigberry manzanita, a tree species native to California and Baja California

See also
 Glauca (disambiguation)